Manipur Statehood Day Women's Polo Tournament is an annual international women's polo tournament in Imphal, Manipur. It is organized in the Imphal Polo Ground, the oldest pologround in the world.  It is the first and the only international women's polo tournament ever organized in India.
Manipur Statehood Day Women's Polo Tournament 2016 is the first event. The first tournament event marked the 60th Anniversary of the All Manipur Polo Association (AMPA). The polo association was established in 1955 by Ningthou Bodhachandra, His Highness, the then King of Manipur.

Past Tournament Results

See also 
 Daughters of the Polo God
 Women in India

References 

Polo in Manipur
Polo in India